Burning Flame III (Chinese Traditional: 烈火雄心3) is a TVB production.

It is an independent installment to 1998's Burning Flame and 2002's Burning Flame II.

Pre-release

Development
Burning Flame III will have a new storyline and will not continue where its predecessor left off. The main theme is still on firefighters' duties and challenges. Wong Hei will continue his legacy as a firefighter alongside the other main casts Kevin Cheng, Bosco Wong and Myolie Wu.

Character relations
Besides focusing on firefighters' duties, Burning Flame III also shed light on father and son relationship between Wong Hei and his onscreen father Kong Hon. Moreover, there are also romantic plots including a budding love triangle between Wong Hei and his onscreen best friend colleague Kevin Cheng for female lead Myolie Wu. At the same time Kevin Cheng is also being pursued by Leanne Li. Bosco Wong will have love line with Aimee Chan and Stephen Wong will be romantically involved with Elaine Yiu.

Cast

Chung Family

Cheuk Family

Ko Family

Fong Family

Other Cast

Awards and nominations
TVB Anniversary Awards (2009)
 Best Drama
 Best Actor (Kevin Cheng)
 Best Actor (Bosco Wong)
 Best Actor (Wong He)
 Best Actress (Myolie Wu)
 Best Supporting Actress (Aimee Chan)
 My Favourite Male Character (Wong He)
 Most Improved Actress (Aimee Chan)

Viewership ratings

References

External links
TVB.com Burning Flame III - Official Website 
BATGWA.com News on Blessing Ceremony

TVB dramas
2009 Hong Kong television series debuts
2009 Hong Kong television series endings